This is a list of Brazilian television related events from 2000.

Events
Television celebrates 50 years in Brazil, Rede Globo has its 35th anniversary.

Debuts

International
 Law & Order: Special Victims Unit (Unknown)

Television shows

1970s
Turma da Mônica (1976–present)

1990s
Malhação (1995–present)
Cocoricó (1996–present)

Ending this year
Rede Globo started on glasses from season 2000–2001.

Births

Deaths

See also
2000 in Brazil
List of Brazilian films of 2000